The Matis people are an indigenous people of Brazil.

Matis may also refer to:

 Matis language, a Panoan language
 Mati tribe, an Albanian tribe
 MATIS Group, a French-based group of companies

People with the name 
 Clark Matis (born 1946), American skier
 Francisco Javier Matís (1763–1851), Colombian-born painter and botanical illustrator
 Georges Matis (died 1967), French singer-songwriter and pianist
 Marcel Matis, Romanian football player
 Matis Louvel (born 1999), French cyclist
 Matúš Matis (born 1993), Slovak ice hockey player
 Morganne Matis, French singer
 Răzvan Matiș (born 2001), Romanian football player

See also 
 Mati (disambiguation)
 Matisse (disambiguation)
 Mathis (disambiguation)
 Mathys
 Matiz (disambiguation)